Anna Söderberg (born 11 June 1973 in Knista) is a female discus thrower from Sweden. Her personal best throw of 64.54 metres, achieved in July 1999 in Aremark, is the Swedish record for the event. She has represented her country at the Olympic Games on three occasions – in 2000, 2004 and 2008. She has also competed at the World Championships in Athletics, taking part in every edition from 1997 to 2009 with the sole exception of the 2001 World Championships.

At European level, she has taken part in the quadrennial European Athletics Championships three times; her best performance at the competition is eleventh place, which she achieved in both 2006 and 2010. Söderberg has been ever-present on the national scene and won every discus contest at the Swedish Athletics Championships from 1993 to 2010 – an unrivalled streak of eighteen straight victories. She has a similar pedigree at the Finland-Sweden athletics international and she won her 17th discus title at the competition in 2010. She opted to have shoulder surgery at the end of the year in order to resolve an ongoing complaint.

Achievements

References

External links

1973 births
Living people
Swedish female discus throwers
Athletes (track and field) at the 2000 Summer Olympics
Athletes (track and field) at the 2004 Summer Olympics
Athletes (track and field) at the 2008 Summer Olympics
Olympic athletes of Sweden